Georg Philipp Wilhelm Voigt (16 September 1866 – 13 April 1927) was a German politician. Voigt was the mayor of Rixdorf, Barmen, Frankfurt, and Marburg.

Political career 
Voigt, the son of a hotelier, was born in Klein-Schellmühl near Danzig, Prussia (Młyniska, Gdańsk). He studied law between 1886 and 1890 at the universities of Breslau (Wrocław), Berlin and Königsberg (Kaliningrad). In 1899, Voigt became the mayor of Rixdorf (nowadays a part of Berlin-Neukölln) and was also the mayor of Barmen between 1906 and 1912, before becoming the mayor of Frankfurt. From 1907, he was a member of the Prussian House of Lords for the National Liberal Party, which later became the German Democratic Party.

Voigt was mayor during the French occupation of Frankfurt 6 April – 17 May 1920. He issued a "severe warning" calling on the population to remain calm and follow the requests of the occupying troops following the Hauptwache Incident on 7 April.

After losing the 1924 Frankfurt mayoral elections, Voigt was elected in November of that year to be the mayor of Marburg from February 1925, where he governed until his death in April 1927. He was buried in Berlin-Zehlendorf.

References

Further reading 
 

1866 births
1927 deaths
Politicians from Gdańsk
People from the Province of Prussia
National Liberal Party (Germany) politicians
German Democratic Party politicians
University of Breslau alumni
Humboldt University of Berlin alumni
University of Königsberg alumni
Members of the Prussian House of Lords
Mayors of Frankfurt
Mayors of Marburg